The Nissan Diesel Space Runner JP (kana:日産ディーゼル・スペースランナーJP) was a medium-duty single-decker bus produced by the Japanese manufacturer Nissan Diesel from 1994 until 2010. The range was primarily available as a public bus and it can be either constructed as a complete bus or a bus chassis.

Models 
U-JP211 (1994)
KC-JP250 (1995)
KL-JP252 (1999)
PK-JP360 (2004)
PDG-JP820 (2007)

External links 

Nissan Diesel Space Runner JP Homepage

Bus chassis
Buses of Japan
Low-entry buses
Midibuses
Single-deck buses
Space Runner JP
UD trucks
Vehicles introduced in 1994